Micheln is a village and a former municipality in the district of Anhalt-Bitterfeld, in Saxony-Anhalt, Germany. Since 1 January 2010, it is part of the municipality Osternienburger Land.

On June 23, 2004, the village was severely damaged by a F3 tornado having wind speeds until 300 km/h. 70% of the village's buildings were nearly destroyed. Although the tornado belonged to the strongest in 30 years, nobody was killed.

External links 
 2004 tornado in Micheln (in German)

Former municipalities in Saxony-Anhalt
Osternienburger Land